The 2022 CONMEBOL Copa América de Futsal was the 13th edition of the Copa América de Futsal, the international futsal championship under FIFA rules organised by CONMEBOL for the men's national teams of South America. It was held in Asunción, Paraguay from 29 January to 6 February 2022.

The tournament was originally scheduled to be held in Rio de Janeiro, Brazil. However, on 27 December 2021 the Brazilian Football Confederation asked CONMEBOL to transfer the event to Paraguay because of the sanitary restrictions imposed in Brazil due to the COVID-19 pandemic. CONMEBOL confirmed the change to Paraguay on 4 January 2022, maintaining the same dates. Planned to be held in 2021, the tournament was postponed until 2022 due to the COVID-19 pandemic and it marked the return of the Copa América de Futsal after four years as the 2019 edition ended up being cancelled. 

Brazil were the defending champions, having won their tenth title in 2017, but were eliminated by Argentina in the semi-finals leading to the third place match against Colombia, which they won by 3–0 score. Argentina won their third title after defeating Paraguay 1–0 in the final.

Teams
All ten CONMEBOL member national teams entered the tournament.

Venue 

Rio de Janeiro, Brazil was originally named as host city of the tournament at the CONMEBOL Council meeting held on 27 October 2021. with the Barra Olympic Park as venue of the matches. However, on 27 December 2021 the Brazilian Football Confederation sent a letter to CONMEBOL requesting to transfer the tournament to Paraguay because it could not obtain the exceptions to the sanitary measures adopted by the Brazilian government related to the COVID-19 pandemic for the participating delegations. On 4 January 2022 CONMEBOL confirmed Asunción, Paraguay as the new host city through a note sent to its member associations.

All matches took place at the SND Arena owned by the National Secretary of Sports of Paraguay and located in the Hipódromo neighbourhood in Asunción.

Draw
The draw of the tournament was held on 20 December 2021, 14:30 PYST (UTC−3), at the CONMEBOL Convention Centre in Luque, Paraguay. The hosts (at that moment) and holders, Brazil, and the previous tournament's runners-up, Argentina were seeded and assigned to the head of the groups A and B respectively. The remaining eight teams were split into four "pairing pots" (Paraguay–Uruguay, Colombia–Venezuela, Bolivia–Ecuador, Peru–Chile) based on the final placement they reached in the previous edition of the tournament (shown in brackets).

From each pot, the first team drawn was placed into Group A and the second team drawn was placed into Group B. In both groups, teams from pot 1 were allocated in position 2, teams from pot 2 in position 3, teams from pot 3 in position 4 and teams from pot 4 in position 5.

The draw resulted in the following groups:

Match officials
On 28 december 2021, CONMEBOL informed to its member associations the referees appointed for the tournament.

Squads

Each national team had to submit a squad of at least 8 and up to 14 players, including a minimum of two goalkeepers (Regulations Article 29).

Group stage
The top two teams of each group advance to the semi-finals.

Tiebreakers
The ranking of teams in the group stage is determined as follows (Regulations article 19 and 20):
 Points obtained in all group matches (three points for a win, one for a draw, none for a defeat);
 Goal difference in the matches played between the teams in question;
 Number of goals scored in the matches played between the teams in question;
 Goal difference in all group matches;
 Number of goals scored in all group matches;
 Points obtained in the matches played between the teams in question;
 Fewer red cards received
 Fewer yellow cards received
 Drawing of lots.

All match times listed are in PYST (UTC−3), as listed by CONMEBOL.

Group A

Group B

Final stage
In the final stage, if a match is tied after the regular playing time (Regulations article 21):
In the semi-finals and final, extra time would be played (two periods of five minutes each). If still tied after extra time, the match would be decided by a penalty shoot-out.
In the play-offs for third to tenth place, extra time would not be played, and the match would be decided by a penalty shoot-out.

All match times listed are in PYST (UTC−3), as listed by CONMEBOL.

Bracket

Semi-finals

Ninth place play-off

Seventh place play-off

Fifth place play-off

Third place play-off

Final

References

External links

2022
2022 in South American futsal
2022 in Brazilian football
January 2022 sports events in South America
February 2022 sports events in South America
2022 Copa America de Futsal